Backdraft is a phenomenon in a fire (see also Flashover).

Backdraft may also refer to:

 Backdraft (film), a 1991 American drama thriller film directed by Ron Howard
 Backdraft 2, the 2019 sequel
 Backdraft (drink), a cocktail
 Backdraft (attraction), a show in various Universal Studios Theme Parks
 Backdraft (album), a 2013 album by Fallstar